Juror 13 is a one-shot American manga-inspired comic written and illustrated by D. J. Milky and published by Tokyopop. The manga was released by Tokyopop on January 1, 2006.

Reception
About.com's Katherine Luther describes Juror 13 as "a fun and adventurous manga mystery with surprises at every turn." IGN's Hilary Goldstein criticises the manga for having a storyline that is "painfully ordinary until the last handful of pages".

References

External links
 Official Tokyopop Juror 13 website

Mystery comics
Tokyopop titles